This is a discography for the Gospel Music Hall of Fame group The Blackwood Brothers.

Albums

Compilations
1960: Statesmen-Blackwood Favorites
1964: TV Requests
1964: The Best Of The Blackwood Brothers Quartet
1967: The Best Of The Blackwood Brothers Quartet, Volume 2
1970: Skylite Presents The Best Of The Blackwood Brothers
1972: Memorial Album, Vol. 1
1973: Memorial Album, Vol. 2 Featuring R.W. Blackwood and Bill Lyles
1973: Best of the Best of The Blackwood Brothers
1977: Sixteen All-Time Favorites
1982: Through The Years...Live!
1985: All Their Best
1986: Best Of The Blackwood Brothers
1990: Blackwood Brothers Classics, Vol. 1
1990: Blackwood Brothers Classics, Vol. 2
1990: Blackwood Brothers Classics, Vol. 3
1991: Blackwood Brothers Classics, Vol. 4
1991: Blackwood Brothers Classics, Vol. 5
2002: "Rock-a-My-Soul [Box Set (Bear Family)]
2015: "The Ultimate Blackwood Brothers: 80 Years, 80 Songs [Box Set (Daywind)]

Discographies of American artists
Christian music discographies